Pando Creek is a Uruguayan stream, crossing Canelones Department. It flows into the Río de la Plata. Its name derives from the nearby city of Pando.

See also
List of rivers of Uruguay

References

Rivers of Uruguay
Rivers of Canelones Department
Pando, Uruguay